York Township is a township in York County, Pennsylvania. The township is a suburb of The City of York. The population was 29,737 at the 2020 census.

History
York Township was formed in 1753 when very few settlers lived there. Most lived in the southeast part, most of which subsequently seceded into the boroughs of Dallastown, Red Lion, and Yoe. The township was mostly rural until after World War II. Today York Township is still partially rural, but is mostly suburban in character as the most populous suburb of York.

Geography

Demographics
At the 2000 census there were 23,637 people, 9,857 households, and 6,604 families living in the township.  The population density was 928.0 people per square mile (358.3/km).  There were 10,258 housing units at an average density of 402.7/sq mi (155.5/km).  The racial makeup of the township was 95.95% White, 1.52% African American, 0.14% Native American, 1.24% Asian, 0.03% Pacific Islander, 0.36% from other races, and 0.76% from two or more races. Hispanic or Latino of any race were 1.43%.

Of the 9,857 households 27.7% had children under the age of 18 living with them, 57.9% were married couples living together, 6.5% had a female householder with no husband present, and 33.0% were non-families. 27.3% of households were one person and 11.5% were one person aged 65 or older.  The average household size was 2.34 and the average family size was 2.85.

The age distribution was 21.6% under the age of 18, 7.5% from 18 to 24, 27.7% from 25 to 44, 25.0% from 45 to 64, and 18.2% 65 or older.  The median age was 41 years. For every 100 females, there were 92.8 males.  For every 100 females age 18 and over, there were 89.6 males.

The median household income was $48,449 and the median family income  was $57,177. Males had a median income of $40,207 versus $27,558 for females. The per capita income for the township was $25,169.  About 3.7% of families and 5.0% of the population were below the poverty line, including 4.7% of those under age 18 and 6.7% of those age 65 or over.

References

External links

 York Township official website

Populated places established in 1748
Townships in York County, Pennsylvania
Townships in Pennsylvania